The 2018–19 season is Aizawl's 35th competitive season and its fourth competitive season in the I-League, India's top flight professional football league. The season covers the period from 1 June 2018 to 31 May 2019.

Squad information

Current squad

Kit
Supplier: Vamos / Sponsor: NE Consultancy Services

Competitions

Overview

Mizoram Premier League

The Mizoram Premier League fixtures were announced on 31 August 2018.

League table

Results by match

Knockout stage

Matches

Semi–finals

Final

I–League

The I-League fixtures were announced on 5 October 2018.

League table

Results by match

Matches

Super Cup

The Super Cup venue and fixtures were announced on 5 February 2019 with all matches to be played at Kalinga Stadium in Bhubaneswar. By the virtue of finishing outside top-6, the Aizawl had to play a qualification round in the Super Cup. Before the qualification round, seven I-League clubs including the Aizawl announced they will withdraw from the Super Cup, citing "unfair treatment to I-League clubs." They boycotted the qualifying round which resulted in walkover for the Chennaiyin to the main tournament.

Matches

Awards

Player

References

See also
 2018–19 in Indian football
 2018–19 I-League

2018–19 I-League by team
Aizawl FC seasons